Henderson railway station is a major station on the Western Line of the Auckland railway network in New Zealand. It is located near the town centre of Henderson, the western administration offices of Auckland Council, and a major shopping centre, WestCity Waitakere.

History  
The station was opened on 2 October 1880 for goods and on 21 December 1880 for all services including passengers.

In 21 August 2010 a "Distributed Stabling Facility" was opened because locals objected to the proposal to open the facility at Ranui railway station. ARTA had proposed it as part of the upgrading of the network, to store up to 11 trains and to clean trains when out of service; with staff car parking and welfare facilities.

Major upgrade
A major upgrade of the station was completed on 24 October 2006. The station opened on 2 November 2006, 125 years after the railway first reached Henderson. It has an island platform. Stairs and escalators, enclosed in transparent panels, connect to an overhead walkway that connects to the council's office buildings and to the adjacent Railside Avenue.

Station name 
It was proposed that the station be renamed Waitakere Central when it was upgraded because it was integrated with the then Waitakere City Council's new Civic Building. There were objections that there would be confusion with Waitakere railway station, also on the Western Line. Due to opposition to the name change, the station has Waitakere Central only as a subtitle. In practice, the station is never referred to by the name but the council uses it to refer to its premises, directly above the platforms.

Services
Auckland One Rail, on behalf of Auckland Transport, operates suburban train services between Swanson and Britomart.

Bus routes 14t, 14w, 120, 131, 133, 133x, 134, 138, 141, 142, 143, 146, 152, 154 and 162 arrive and depart from the transport interchange on Railside Avenue.

See also 
 List of Auckland railway stations
 Public transport in Auckland

References

Rail transport in Auckland
Railway stations in New Zealand
Railway stations opened in 1880
Henderson-Massey Local Board Area
Buildings and structures in Auckland
West Auckland, New Zealand